Rekha, also known as Akshara, is an Indian actress, who predominantly acts in Kannada films and also appears in Telugu and Tamil films. While pursuing modelling, she made her acting debut in the 2001 Kannada film Chitra and has since starred in over 30 films in various South Indian languages.

Career
Rekha was born and brought up in Bangalore, Karnataka. She did her schooling at the Basava Residential Girls School in Kengeri, Bangalore. She was doing her BBA correspondence course from the University of Madras, while modelling part-time and trying to pursue an acting career. She was eventually signed by Jayashree Devi for the Ramoji Rao-produced college drama Chithra, in which she played a NRI student. The same year, she starred in blockbuster Huchcha, alongside Sudeep and made her debut in Telugu cinema with Sreenu Vaitla's Anandam, all three ventures becoming commercially successful. and the Telugu film Dongodu featuring Ravi Teja in the lead, while making her Tamil debut with Sabapathy's love triangle-based film Punnagai Poove. 2003 she also had her first and till date only Hindi release, Mudda with Arya Babbar and was seen in a supporting role in the female-oriented Three Roses that featured Rambha, Jyothika and Laila Mehdin in the lead. She was paired with Ganesh in his first feature film appearance in Chellata as well as in Hudugaata the next year, both emerging commercial successes. After her subsequent releases that year bombed at the box office, she starred in the bilingual Ninna Nedu Repu / Netru Indru Naalai and in Ramesh Arvind's directorial Accident, which became critically acclaimed, while making special appearances in the films Mast Maja Maadi, Raaj The Showman and Yogi. In 2010, she had a single release, Appu and Pappu, while her most recent release was Boss, paired with Darshan again. She is currently working on projects such as Prema Chandramama, Jolly Boy  alongside Diganth, directed by Sabapathy again, and Thulasi.

Filmography

References

External links 

 
 

Indian film actresses
Kannada actresses
Actresses in Kannada cinema
Living people
Actresses from Bangalore
Actresses in Tamil cinema
21st-century Indian actresses
Actresses in Telugu cinema
1985 births